The first election for the Parliament of the Cape of Good Hope were held in 1854. There were no clear party lines, however many representatives for Eastern electoral districts subscribed to a common programme which emphasised separation from the Cape Colony or moving the seat of colonial government eastward, a vagrancy law, or increasing the property qualification part of the franchise (which would have reduced the number of non-Whites able to vote).

Electoral system

Voting system
The election was conducted on the basis of the multi-racial Cape Qualified Franchise: Cape residents qualified as voters based on a universal minimum level of property ownership, regardless of race.

Elections to the upper house, the Cape Legislative Council, were conducted under a cumulative voting electoral system. This gave each voter several votes, which they could give to a single candidate, or split amongst several. This was justified by the Report from a Committee of the Board of Trade and Plantations on the basis that it would prevent any single group gaining a monopoly on power, as a minority voting in unison could ensure the return of their preferred candidate. The Cape Colony White population at the time was majority Boer, with British settlers forming a minority. The British Government had pushed for the franchise property qualification to be low, thereby extending the franchise to the non-white population, who it was believed were more likely to side with the British than the Boers.

The population for the colony was estimated at 225,000 in 1853, with coloureds outnumbering whites by a ratio of 55:45. The ratio of registered voters however was heavily in favour of whites.

Constituencies
For elections to the House of Assembly, the Cape was divided into 22 electoral divisions, returning a total of 46 members. The electoral division boundaries corresponded with the existing Cape Colony fiscal divisions. The only exceptions to this were for Albany, and the urban areas of Cape Town-Green Point and Grahamstown, (which were not included in the Cape electoral division), which had their own electoral divisions.

References

1854 elections in Africa
Elections in the Cape Colony
Parliamentary election